Levantine archaeology is the archaeological study of the Levant. It is also known as Syro-Palestinian archaeology or Palestinian archaeology (particularly when the area of inquiry centers on ancient Palestine). Besides its importance to the discipline of Biblical archaeology, the Levant is highly important when forming an understanding of the history of the earliest peoples of the Stone Age.

Current archaeological digs in Israel are carried out by the Israel Antiquities Authority (IAA), and in the areas governed by the Palestinian Authority (PA), by its Ministry of Tourism and Antiquity, working under the auspices of the IAA. The Palestinian Authority prohibits unrestricted excavation at sites of archaeological importance. There are equivalent and similarly named authorities in Jordan and in Cyprus, a Directorate-General of Antiquities and Museums in Syria and a department of the Ministry of Culture and Tourism (Turkey).

Terminology and scope
Levantine archaeology encompasses excavations, salvage, conservation and reconstruction efforts, as well as off-site research, interpretation, and other scholarship. The geographical scope of Levantine archaeology includes the Hatay Province of Turkey, Syria, Lebanon, Israel, Palestine, Jordan, and Cyprus. The terminology for archaeology in the Levant has been defined in various, often competing or overlapping ways. Prior to and during the period of the British Mandate in Palestine (1920–1948), archaeology of the region was typically described as Palestinian archaeology or Biblical archaeology. Under the influence of William F. Albright (1891–1971), biblical inquiry and narratives became increasingly important; indeed, Albright conceived of Palestinian archaeology or Levantine archaeology as a sub-field of biblical archaeology. "The archaeology of ancient Israel," is described by Franken and Franken-Battershill as, "but a small part of the far greater study of Palestinian archaeology [...]" in A Primer of Old Testament Archaeology (1963). In a survey of North American dissertations, the overwhelming emphasis has been on the southern Levant. However it is only when considering the northern Levant alongside the southern that wider archaeological and historical questions can be addressed.

While both Classical archaeology and Levantine archaeology deal with the same general region of study, the focus and approach of these interrelated disciplines differs. Even scholars who have continued to advocate a role for Classical archaeology have accepted the existence of a general branch of Levantine archaeology. In addition, Classical archaeology may cover areas relevant to the Bible outside of the Levant (e.g., Egypt or Persia) and it takes into account the use and explanation of biblical texts, which Levantine archaeologist ignore. Beyond its importance to the discipline of classical archaeology, the region of the Levant is critical for an understanding of the history of the earliest peoples of the Stone Age

In academic, political, and public settings, the region's archaeology can also be described in terms of ancient or modern Israel, Jordan, Palestine, Lebanon, Syria, Cyprus, and the Hatay province of Turkey. Archaeologists may define the geographic range more narrowly, especially for inquiries that focus on 'Israel' or 'Palestine,' whether construed as ancient or modern territories. The shifting terminology over the past 50 years reflects political tensions that operate within and upon the field.

Levantine archaeology in the 21st century has relegated biblical concerns to a less dominant position, functioning as a "big tent" incorporating multiple archaeological practices. The Levant has displayed cultural continuity during most historical periods, leading to the increased study of the region as a whole.

Temporal scope

From prehistoric times through the Iron Age, chronological periods are usually named in keeping with technological developments that characterized that era. From the Babylonian era onward, naming is based on historical events. Scholars often disagree on the exact dates and terminology to be used for each period. Some definitions for the temporal scope, particularly earlier on tended to exclude events after the Byzantine Period, but the temporal scope of Levantine archaeology has expanded over the years. In 1982, James A. Sauer wrote that the Islamic periods (630-1918 CE) were part of Levantine archaeological research, and that while some periods had been "ignored, neglected, or even discarded for the sake of other periods," it is now "an almost universally accepted principle that archaeological evidence from all periods must be treated with equal care."

Leslie J. Hoppe, writing in 1987, submits that Dever's definition of temporal scope of Levantine archaeology excludes the Early Arab period (640-1099), the Crusader period (1099–1291), the Mamluk period (1250–1517) and the Ottoman period (1517-1918). However, Dever's definition of the temporal scope of the field in What Did the Biblical Writers Know, and When Did They Know It? (2001), indicates that Hoppe's critique is no longer valid. There, Dever writes that the time-frame of Levantine archaeology, "extends far beyond the 'biblical period,' embracing everything from the Lower Paleolithic to the Ottoman period."

List of archaeological periods

The list below, from the Paleolithic Age to the Byzantine period, is drawn from the definitions provided by the Mercer Dictionary of the Bible. For periods thereafter, the terminology and dates come from Sauer and Hoppe.

Prehistory is defined as the period preceding the advent of writing, which brought about the creation of written history. For the Levant the introduction of writing occurs at varying moments, but the Late Bronze Age is considered as the first period firmly outside prehistory. To avoid sub-regional conflicts, the  prehistory as a category is left out of the list.
 Paleolithic (Old Stone) Age = 1,500,000-14,000 BCE
 Epipaleolithic (Mesolithic, Middle Stone) Age = 14,000-8,000 BCE
 Neolithic (New Stone) Age = 8,000-5,800 BCE
 Chalcolithic (Copper Stone) Age = 5,800-3,700 BCE
Bronze Age
 Early Bronze (EB) Age = 3,700-2,500 BCE
 EB IV/Intermediate Bronze (IB) (formerly EB IV/MB I) = 2,500-2,000 BCE
 Middle Bronze (MB) Age = 2,200-1,550 BCE
 MB I (formerly MB IIA) = 2,000-1,750 BCE
 MB II(-III) (formerly MB IIB/C) = 1,750-1550 BCE
 Late Bronze (LB) Age = 1,550-1,200 BCE
 LB I = 1,550-1,400 BCE
 LB II = 1,400-1,200 BCE
 Iron Age = 1,200-586 BCE 
 Iron I = 1,200-980 BCE
 Iron IIA = 980-830 BCE
 Iron IIB = 830-721 BCE
 Iron IIC = 721-586 BCE
 Babylonian period = 586-539 BCE
 Persian period = 539-332 BCE
 Hellenistic period = 332-63 BCE
 Early Hellenistic = 332-198 BCE
 Late Hellenistic = 198-63 BCE
 Roman period = 63 BCE-324 CE
 Early Roman = 63 BCE-135 CE
 Late Roman = 135-324 CE
 Byzantine period = 324-640 CE
 Islamic period = 630-1918 CE
 Early Arab period = 640-1099 CE
 Crusader period = 1099-1291 CE
 Mamluk period = 1250-1517 CE
 Ottoman period = 1517-1918 CE

History

Modern Palestinian archaeology began in the late 19th century. Early expeditions lacked standardized methods for excavation and interpretation, and were often little more than treasure-hunting expeditions. A lack of awareness of the importance of stratigraphy in dating objects led to digging long trenches through the middle of a site that made work by later archaeologists more difficult.

Edward Robinson identified numerous sites from antiquity and published his findings with Eli Smith in a pivotal three-volume study entitled Biblical Researches in Palestine and the Adjacent Regions: Journal of Travels in the Year 1838. In Syria, Ernest Renan carried out research in the 1860s and Howard Crosby Butler of Princeton University carried out surveys of Byzantine Christian sites (1904–1909). In the early 1900s, major projects were set up at Samaria, Gezer, Megiddo and Jericho.

An early school of modern Palestinian archaeology was led by William F. Albright, whose work focused on biblical narratives. Albright himself held that Frederick Jones Bliss (1857–1939) was the father of Palestinian archaeology, although Bliss is not well known in the field. Jeffrey A. Blakely attributes this to Bliss' successor at the Palestine Exploration Fund, R.A.S. Macalister (1870–1950), who underplayed his predecessor's achievements.

After the creation of independent Arab states in the region, national schools of archaeology were established in the 1960s. The research focuses and perspectives of these institutions differed from those of Western archaeological approaches, tending to eschew biblical studies and the search for theological roots in the Holy Land and concentrating more, though not exclusively on Islamic archaeology. In doing so, Arab archaeologists added a "vigorous new element to Syro-Palestinian archaeology."

While the importance of stratigraphy, typology and balk grew in the mid-twentieth century, the continued tendency to ignore hard data in favour of subjective interpretations invited criticism. Paul W. Lapp, for example, whom many thought would take up the mantle of Albright before his premature death in 1970, wrote:"Too much of Palestinian archaeology is an inflated fabrication [...] Too often a subjective interpretation, not based on empirical stratigraphic observation, is used to demonstrate the validity of another subjective interpretation. We assign close dates to a group of pots on subjective typological grounds and go on to cite our opinion as independent evidence for similarly dating a parallel group. Too much of Palestinian archaeology's foundation building has involved chasing ad hominem arguments around in a circle."

In 1974, William Dever established the secular, non-biblical school of Syro-Palestinian archaeology and mounted a series of attacks on the very definition of biblical archaeology. Dever argued that the name of such inquiry should be changed to "archaeology of the Bible" or "archaeology of the Biblical period" to delineate the narrow temporal focus of Biblical archaeologists. Frank Moore Cross, who had studied under Albright and had taught Dever, emphasized that in Albright's view, biblical archaeology was not synonymous with Palestinian archaeology, but rather that, "William Foxwell Albright regarded Palestinian archaeology or Levantine archaeology as a small, if important section of biblical archaeology. One finds it ironical that recent students suppose them interchangeable terms." Dever agreed that the terms were not interchangeable, but claimed that "'Syro-Palestinian archaeology' is not the same as the 'biblical archaeology'. I regret to say that all who would defend Albright and 'biblical archaeology' on this ground, are sadly out of touch with reality in the field of archaeology."

In recent decades, the term Levantine archaeology has generally replaced Syro-Palestinian archaeology. Electronic database results reveal an "overwhelming adoption" of the term ‘Levant’ when compared to ‘Syria-Palestine’ for archaeological studies. This is primarily due to the strong cultural and geographic continuity of the Levant, the northern sections of which were generally ignored in Syro-Palestinian archaeology. Towards the end of the twentieth century, Palestinian archaeology and/or Levantine archaeology became a more interdisciplinary practice. Specialists in archaeozoology, archaeobotany, geology, anthropology and epigraphy now work together to produce essential environmental and non-environmental data in multidisciplinary projects.

Foci in Levantine archaeology

Ceramics analysis

A central concern of Levantine archaeology since its genesis has been the study of ceramics. Whole pots and richly decorated pottery are uncommon in the Levant and the plainer, less ornate ceramic artifacts of the region have served the analytical goals of archaeologists, much more than those of museum collectors. The ubiquity of pottery sherds and their long history of use in the region makes ceramics analysis a particularly useful sub-discipline of Levantine archaeology, used to address issues of terminology and periodization. Awareness of the value of pottery gained early recognition in a landmark survey conducted by Edward Robinson and Eli Smith, whose findings were published in first two works on the subject: Biblical Researches in Palestine (1841) and Later Biblical Researches (1851).
 
Ceramics analysis in Levantine archaeology has suffered from insularity and conservatism, due to the legacy of what J.P Dessel and Alexander H. Joffe call "the imperial hubris of pan-optic 'Biblical Archaeology.'" The dominance of biblical archaeological approaches meant that the sub-discipline was cut off from other branches of ancient Near Eastern studies, apart from occasional references to Northwest Semitic epigraphy and Assyriology, as exemplified in the Mesha Stele, the Sefire Stelae, and the Tel Dan Stele.

As a result, widely varying principles, emphases, and definitions are used to determine local typologies among archaeologists working in the region. Attempts to identify and bridge the gaps made some headway at the Durham conference, though it was recognized that agreement on a single method of ceramic analysis or a single definition of a type may not be possible. The solution proposed by Dessel and Joffe is for all archaeologists in the field to provide more explicit descriptions of the objects that they study. The more information provided and shared between those in related sub-disciplines, the more likely it is that they will be able to identify and understand the commonalities in the different typological systems.

Defining Phoenician
Levantine archaeology also includes the study of Phoenician culture, cosmopolitan in character and widespread in its distribution in the region. According to Benjamin Sass and Christoph Uehlinger, the questions of what is actually Phoenician and what is specifically Phoenician, in Phoenician iconography, constitute one well-known crux of Levantine archaeology. Without answers to these questions, the authors contend that research exploring the degree to which Phoenician art and symbolism penetrated into the different areas of Syria and Palestine will make little progress.

Practitioners

Israeli
Jewish interest in archaeology dates to the beginnings of the Zionist movement and the founding of the Jewish Palestine Exploration Society in 1914. Excavations at this early stage focused on sites related to the Bible and ancient Jewish history and included Philistine sites in Afula and Nahariya, as well as a second- to fourth-century village at Beth She'arim and a synagogue in Bet Alpha. Early archaeological pioneers in 1920s and 1930s included Nahman Avigad, Michael Avi-Yonah, Ruth Amiran, Immanuel Ben-Dor, Avraham Biran, Benjamin Mazar, E.L. Sukenik, and Shmuel Yeivin.

By the 1950s, in contrast to the religious motivations of Biblical archaeologists, Israeli archaeology developed as a secular discipline motivated in part by the nationalistic desire to affirm the link between the modern, nascent Israeli nation-state and the ancient Jewish population of the land. Paleolithic archaeology was of little interest, nor was archaeology of Christian and Muslim periods. Yigael Yadin, the pioneer of the Israeli School of archaeology, excavated some of the most important sites in the region, including the Qumran Caves, Masada, Hazor and Tel Megiddo. Yadin's world view was that the identity of modern Israel was directly tied to the revolutionary past of the ancient Jewish population of the region. He therefore focused much of his work on excavating sites related to previous periods of Israelite nationalistic struggles: Hazor, which he associated with the conquest of Canaan by Joshua in c. 1250 BCE, and Masada, the site where Jewish rebels held out against the Romans in 72-73 CE. Masada was extensively excavated by a team led by Yadin from 1963 to 1965 and became a monument symbolizing the will of the new Israeli state to survive.

Today, Israeli universities have respected archaeology departments and institutes involved in research, excavation, conservation and training. Notable contemporary archaeologists include Eilat Mazar, Yoram Tsafrir, Ronny Reich, Ehud Netzer, Adam Zertal, Yohanan Aharoni, Eli Shukron, Gabriel Barkay, Israel Finkelstein, Yizhar Hirschfeld, and many more.

British and European

European archaeologists also continue to excavate and research in the region, with many of these projects centered in Arab countries, primary among them Jordan and Syria, and to a lesser extent in Lebanon. The most significant British excavations include the Tell Nebi Mend site (Qadesh) in Syria and the Tell Iktanu and Tell es-Sa'adiyah sites in Jordan. Other notable European projects include Italian excavations at Tell Mardikh (Ebla) and Tell Meskene (Emar) in Syria, French participation in Ras Shamra (Ugarit) in Syria, French excavations at Tell Yarmut and German excavations at Tell Masos (both in modern-day Israel), and Dutch excavations Tell Deir 'Alla in Jordan.

Italian archaeologists were the first to undertake joint missions with Palestinian archaeologists in the West Bank, which were possible only after the signing of the Oslo Accords. The first joint project was conducted in Jericho and coordinated by Hamdan Taha, director of the Palestinian Antiquities Department and the University of Rome "La Sapienza", represented by Paolo Matthiae, the same archeologist who discovered the site of Ebla in 1964. Unlike the joint missions between Americans and Jordanians, this project involved Italians and Palestinians digging at the same holes, side by side.

North American
Apart from Israeli archaeologists, Americans make up the largest group of archaeologists working in Israel. Joint American-Jordanian excavations have been conducted, but Nicolo Marchetti, an Italian archaeologist, says they do not constitute genuine collaboration: "[...] you might find, at a site, one hole with Jordanians and 20 holes with Americans digging in them. After the work, usually it's the Americans who explain to the Jordanians what they've found."

Palestinian

The involvement of Palestinians as practitioners in the study of Palestinian archaeology is relatively recent. The Archaeological Encyclopedia of the Holy Land notes that, "The 1990s have seen the development of Palestinian archaeological activities, with a focus on tell archaeology on the one hand (H. Taha and M. Sadeq) and on the investigation of the indigenous landscape and cultural heritage on the other (K. Nashef and M. Abu Khalaf)."

The Palestinian Archaeology Institute at Bir Zeit University in Ramallah was established in 1987 with the help of Albert Glock, who headed the archaeology department at the university at the time. Glock's objective was to establish an archaeological program that would emphasize the Palestinian presence in Palestine, informed by his belief that, "Archaeology, as everything else, is politics, and my politics [are those] of the losers." Glock was killed in the West Bank by unidentified gunmen in 1992. The first archaeological site excavated by researchers from Bir Zeit University was undertaken in Tell Jenin in 1993.

Such a perspective can also be seen in the practices of Hamdan Taha, the director of the Palestinian National Authority's Department of Antiquities and Cultural Heritage, responsible for overseeing preservation and excavation projects that involve both internationals and Palestinians. Gerrit van der Kooij, an archaeologist at Leiden University in the Netherlands who works with Taha, says that, "It doesn't surprise me that outsiders become frustrated [... Taha] sticks by his policy of equal partnership. That means Palestinians must be involved at every step," from planning and digging to publishing. In Van der Kooij's opinion, this policy is "fully justified and adds more social value to the project."

Dever submits that the recent insistence that Palestinian archaeology and history be written by "real Palestinians" stems from the influence of those he terms the "biblical revisionists", such as Keith W. Whitelam, Thomas L. Thompson, Phillip Davies and Niels Peter Lemche. Whitelam's book, The Invention of Ancient Israel: The Silencing of Palestinian History (1996) and Thompson's book, The Mythic Past: Biblical Archaeology and the Myth of Israel (1999) were both translated into Arabic shortly after their publication. Dever speculates that, "Nashef and many other Palestinian political activists have obviously read it." Harshly critical of both books, Dever accuses Whitelam's thesis that Israelis and "Jewish-inspired Christians" invented Israel, thus deliberately robbing Palestinians of their history, of being "extremely inflammatory" and "bordering on anti-Semitism", and Thompson's book of being "even more rabid."

Dever cites an editorial by Nashef published in the Journal of Palestinian Archaeology in July 2000 entitled, "The Debate on 'Ancient Israel': A Palestinian Perspective", that explicitly names the four "biblical revisionists" mentioned above, as evidence for his claim that their "rhetoric" has influenced Palestinian archaeologists. In the editorial itself, Nashef writes: "The fact of the matter is, the Palestinians have something completely different to offer in the debate on 'ancient Israel,' which seems to threaten the ideological basis of BAR (the American popular magazine, Biblical Archaeology Review, which turned down this piece - WGD): they simply exist, and they have always existed on the soil of Palestine ..."

According to the Palestinian Authority's Ministry of Tourism and Antiquity, in the West Bank and Gaza Strip there are 12,000 archaeological and cultural heritage sites, 60,000 traditional houses, 1,750 major sites of human settlement, and 500 sites which have been excavated to date, 60 of which are major sites.

Archaeology in Israel

Excavation in Israel continues at a relatively rapid pace and is conducted according to generally high standards. Excavators return each year to a number of key sites that have been selected for their potential scientific and cultural interest. Current excavated sites of importance include Ashkelon, Hazor, Megiddo, Tel es-Safi, Dor, Hippos, Tel Kabri, Gamla and Rehov. Recent issues center on the veracity of such artifacts as the Jehoash Inscription and the James Ossuary, as well as the validity of whole chronological schemes. Amihai Mazar and Israel Finkelstein represent leading figures in the debate over the nature and chronology of the United Monarchy.

Archaeology in the West Bank
After the 1948 Arab-Israeli war, the West Bank was annexed by Jordan (1950), and archaeological excavations in the region were carried out by its Department of Antiquities, as had been the case throughout the British Mandate in Palestine. Made up of Muslim and Christian officials and headed by the British archaeologist Gerald Lankaster Harding until 1956, field archaeology was conducted primarily by foreigners. Large-scale expeditions included those of the American Schools of Oriental Research at Tell Balata (1956–1964), the British School of Archaeology at Jericho (1952–1958), and the École Biblique at Tell el-Farah (1946–1960) and Khirbet Qumran (1951–1956). Rising nationalistic pressures led to Harding's dismissal in 1956 and thereafter, the Department of Antiquities was headed by Jordanian nationals.

After Israel occupied the area during the 1967 war, all antiquities in the area came under the control of the Archaeological Staff Officer. Though the Hague Convention prohibits the removal of cultural property from militarily occupied areas, both foreign and Israeli archaeologists mounted extensive excavations that have been criticized as overstepping the bounds of legitimate work to protect endangered sites. Vast amounts of new archaeological data have been uncovered in these explorations, although critics say that "relatively little effort was made to preserve or protect archaeological remains from the later Islamic and Ottoman periods, which were of direct relevance to the areas Muslim inhabitants."

In the early 20th century, Palestinians focused on investigating Palestinian "material culture," as it relates to folklore and customs. In 1920, the Palestine Oriental Society was founded by, most prominently among them Tawfiq Canaan. The work of this society was more ethnographic and anthropological than archaeological. Interest in archaeological fieldwork increased as West Bank universities emerged in the 1980s and cultivated a new approach to Palestinian archaeology. A new generation of Palestinians, like Albert Glock, introduced innovations to the field by studying Islamic and Ottoman period ruins in village contexts.

Notable findings and sites

Belameh
Belameh, located a little over one mile (1.6 km) south of Jenin, is an important Bronze Age site identified with the ancient Ibleam, a Canaanite city mentioned in the Egyptian Royal Archive that was conquered by Thutmose III in the 15th century BCE. Ibleam is also mentioned in three passages of the Hebrew Bible. The location was called Belemoth during Roman-Byzantine times, and Castellum Beleismum in the Crusader sources.

The site was initially discovered by Victor Guérin in 1874, then by Gottlieb Schumacher in 1910, and Bellarmino Bagatti in 1974. Later on, excavations in Khirbet Belameh, led by Hamdan Taha of the Palestinian Antiquities Department, began in 1996. These have focused on a water tunnel carved out of rock sometime in the Late Bronze or Early Iron Age that connected the city at the top of the hill to its water source at the bottom, a spring known as Bir es-Sinjib. The tunnel allowed inhabitants to walk through it undetected, particularly useful during times of siege. There is evidence that the tunnel fell into disuse in the 8th century BCE, and that the entrance was subsequently rehabilitated some time in the Roman period, while the site itself shows occupation into the medieval period. Plans have been drawn up to turn the site into an archaeological park. G. Schumacher had described the water tunnel in 1908, and a small-scale excavation was conducted by Z. Yeivin in 1973. The water passage of Belameh is important for the understanding of ancient water systems in Palestine.

Bethlehem

As of April 2007, the procedures to add Bethlehem and the Church of the Nativity to the UNESCO World Heritage List have been initiated.

Dead Sea Scrolls

The Dead Sea Scrolls are 981 parchments discovered in 11 caves in the hills above Qumran between 1947 and 1956. The discovery of the scrolls was dubbed "[u]nquestionably the greatest manuscript find of modern times" by William F. Albright, and the majority are transcribed in a unique form of Hebrew now known as "Qumran Hebrew", and seen as a link between Biblical Hebrew and Mishnaic Hebrew. Some 120 scrolls are written in Aramaic, and a few of the biblical texts are written in Ancient Greek. Israel purchased some of the parchments, believed to have been composed or transcribed between 1 BCE and 1 ACE, after they were first unearthed by a Bedouin shepherd in 1947. The remainder were acquired by Israel from the Rockefeller Museum in the 1967 war.

When 350 participants from 25 countries gathered at a conference at the Israel Museum marking the fiftieth anniversary of their discovery, Amir Drori, head of the Israel Antiquities Authority (IAA), said that the 2,000-year-old documents were legally acquired and an inseparable part of Jewish tradition. A Palestinian academic, Hamdan Taha, responded that Israel's capture of the works after the 1967 war was theft "which should be recitified now"., Israel is now digitally photographing the thousands of fragments that make up the Dead Sea Scrolls in order to make them freely available on the Internet.

Nablus

The Old City of Nablus consists of seven quarters representing a distinctive style of traditional urban architecture in Palestine. Founded in 72 CE by the emperor Vespasian under the name Neapolis, the city flourished during the Byzantine and Umayyad periods, becoming the seat of a bishopric. Monuments in the city include "nine historic mosques (four built on Byzantine churches and five from the early Islamic period), an Ayyubid mausoleum, and a 17th-century church, but most buildings are Ottoman-era structures such as 2 major khans, 10 Turkish bath houses, 30 olive-oil soap factories (7 of which were functioning), 2850 historic houses and exceptional family palaces, 18 Islamic monuments and 17 sabeel (water fountains)." A few monuments within the Old City date back to the Byzantine and Crusader periods. A Roman-era aqueduct system runs under the city, part of which had recently been preserved by the municipality and opened for visitors.

According to Hamdan Taha, great damage was inflicted on the historic core of the city during Israeli military incursions in 2002–2003. Taha's claim was confirmed by a series of reports produced by UNESCO that noted that pursuant to military operations undertaken in April 2002, hundreds of buildings in the Old City were affected, sixty-four of which were severely damaged. Of these, seventeen were designated as being of particular significance to world heritage, as per an inventory of sites prepared by Graz University between 1997 and 2002. According to UNESCO, reconstruction costs are estimated at tens of millions USD, though "the loss of irreplaceable heritage damage cannot be determined financially."

Tel es-Sultan

Tel es-Sultan (meaning the "Sultan's Hill") is located in Jericho, approximately two kilometers from the city center. Kathleen Kenyon's excavations at the site beginning in 1951, established that it was one of the earliest sites of human habitation, dating back to 9000 BCE. The mound contains several layers attesting to its habitation throughout the ages.

Despite recognition of its importance by archaeologists, the site is not presently included on the World Heritage List. In April 2007, Hamdan Taha announced that the Palestinian Authority's Department of Antiquities and Cultural Heritage had begun the procedures for its nomination.

Challenges posed by the Israeli–Palestinian conflict

West Bank barrier
Construction of the Israeli West Bank barrier has damaged and threatens to damage a number of sites of interest to Palestinian archaeology in and around the Green Line, prompting condemnation from the World Archaeological Congress (WAC) and a call for Israel to abide by UNESCO conventions that protect cultural heritage. In the autumn of 2003, bulldozers preparing the ground for a section of the barrier that runs through Abu Dis in East Jerusalem damaged the remains of a 1,500-year-old Byzantine era monastery. Construction was halted to allow the Israel Antiquities Authority (IAA) to conduct a salvage excavation that recovered a mosaic, among other artifacts. Media reported that an IAA official media blamed the IDF for proceeding without procuring the opinion of the IAA.

Archaeology in Gaza Strip

For the last 3,500 years, Gaza's history has been shaped by its location on the route linking North Africa to the fertile land of the Levant to the north. First strategically important to the Egyptian Pharaohs, it remained so for the many empires who sought to wield power in the region that followed. Gerald Butt, historian and author of Gaza at the Crossroads, explains that, "It's found itself the target of constant sieges - constant battles [...] The people have been subject to rule from all over the globe. Right through the centuries Gaza's been at the centre of the major military campaigns in the Eastern Mediterranean." Gaza's main highway, the Salah al-Din Road, is one of the oldest in the world, and has been traversed by the chariots of the armies of the Pharaohs and Alexander the Great, the cavalry of the Crusaders, and Napoleon Bonaparte.

Having long been overlooked in archaeological research, the number of excavations in the Gaza Strip has multiplied since the establishment in 1995 of the Department of Antiquities in Gaza, a branch of the Ministry of Tourism and Antiquities of the Palestinian National Authority. Plans to build a national archaeological museum also promise to highlight the rich history of Gaza City, which has been described as, "one of the world's oldest living cities." Rapid urban development makes the need for archaeological research all the more urgent to protect the region's archaeological heritage. Population pressure in the tiny Gaza Strip is intense, which means that numerous potential archaeological sites may have been built over and lost. According to specialists, there is much more under ground and under the sea than what has been discovered to date.

Notable findings and sites

Anthedon
Joint archaeological excavations by the Palestinian Department of Antiquities and the École Biblique et Archéologique Française began in the Beach refugee camp in Gaza in 1995. Various artifacts dating back as far as 800 BCE include high walls, pottery, warehouses and mud-brick houses with colorful frescoed walls. Archaeologists believe the site may be Anthedon (Antidon), a major Hellenistic seaport on the Mediterranean which connected Asia and Africa to Europe.

Christian sites
A 6th-century Byzantine church was discovered in 1999 by an Israeli archaeologist on the site of an IDF military installation in the northwestern tip of the Gaza Strip. The well-preserved 1,461-year-old church contains three large and colorful mosaics with floral-motifs and geometric shapes. The most impressive of these is a multi-colored medallion at the entrance to the church. Inscribed therein is the name of the church, St. John, (named for John the Baptist), the names of the mosaic's donors, Victor and Yohanan, and the date of the laying of the church's foundations (544 CE). Also found nearby were a Byzantine hot bath and artificial fishponds.

Palestinian archaeologists have also discovered a number of sites of significance to Christianity. At Tell Umm el ‘Amer in 2001, a Byzantine-era mosaic was unearthed. Experts believe it forms part of the oldest monastic complex ever to be discovered in the Middle East, likely founded in the 3rd century by Saint Hilario. While the archaeologists working at the site are Muslim Palestinians, they see nothing unusual about their desire to protect and promote a Christian shrine in an area inhabited by only 3,500 Christians today. Said Yasser Matar, co-director of the dig: "This is our history; this is our civilisation and we want our people to know about it [...] First we were Christians and later we became Muslims. These people were our forefathers: the ancient Palestinians." Dr. Moin Sadeq, director general of the Department of Antiquities in Gaza, has submitted an application to the United Nations Educational, Scientific and Cultural Organization (UNESCO) to assign it World Heritage Site status and fund the site's protection, restoration and rehabilitation for visitors. Another Byzantine era monastery and mosaic, since named the 'Jabalya Mosaic', was excavated by the Palestinian Department of Antiquities after its discovery by labourers working on Salah ad-Din road in Gaza City.

Tell es-Sakan
Tell es-Sakan is the only Early Bronze Age site in Gaza discovered to date. Located five kilometers south of Gaza City, the site was discovered by chance in 1998 during construction for a new housing complex, and work was halted to allow archaeological soundings to be conducted. The site spans an area of eight to twelve hectares and shows evidence of continuous habitation throughout the Early Bronze Age (3,300 to 2,200 BCE). Joint Franco-Palestinian excavations with UNDP support began in August 2000, covering an area of 1,400 square meters and revealed two main phases of occupation. Four strata at the base of the site reveal Protodynastic Egyptian settlement dating towards the end of the 4th millennium BCE, while middle and upper strata reveal Canaanite settlement during the 3rd millennium BCE.

Challenges posed by the Israeli-Palestinian conflict
In 1974, the IAA removed a sixth-century Byzantine mosaic from Gaza City, dubbed 'King David Playing the Lyre', which is now in the synagogue section of the Israel Museum. According to Jerusalem Post, it is illegal for an occupying power to remove ancient artifacts from the land it occupies, but Israel alleges that the Palestinians have not been able to safeguard antiquities in the areas under their control. Hananya Hizmi, deputy of Israel's Department of Antiquities in Judea and Samaria, explained, "Probably it was done to preserve the mosaic. Maybe there was an intention to return [the mosaic] and it didn't work out. I don't know why."

Archaeology of the Old City of Jerusalem

Sovereignty dispute
Proposals to internationalize the Old City of Jerusalem have been rejected by all parties in the Israeli-Arab conflict, each insisting on exclusive sovereignty. Neil Silberman, an Israeli archaeologist, has demonstrated how legitimate archaeological research and preservation efforts have been exploited by Palestinians and Israelis for partisan ends. Rather than attempting to understand "the natural process of demolition, eradication, rebuilding, evasion, and ideological reinterpretation that has permitted ancient rulers and modern groups to claim exclusive possession," archaeologists have become active participants in the battle. Silberman writes that archaeology, a seemingly objective science, has exacerbated, rather than ameliorated the ongoing nationalist dispute: "The digging continues. Claims and counterclaims about exclusive historical 'ownership' weave together the random acts of violence of bifurcated collective memory."

An archaeological tunnel running the length of the western side of the Temple Mount, as it is known to Jews, or the Haram al-Sharif, as it is known to Muslims, sparked a serious conflict in 1996. As a result, rioting broke out in Jerusalem and spread to the West Bank, leading to the deaths of 86 Palestinians and 15 Israeli soldiers.

Damage to archaeological sites

During the 1948 Arab-Israeli war, and throughout the period of Jordanian rule of Jerusalem which ended in 1967, Jordanian authorities and military forces undertook a policy described by their military commander as "calculated destruction,", aimed at the Jewish Quarter in the Old City of Jerusalem. The Jordanian actions were described in a letter to the United Nations by Yosef Tekoa, Israel's permanent representative to the organization at the time, as a "policy of wanton vandalism, desecration and violation," which resulted in the destruction of all but one of 35 Jewish houses of worship. Synagogues were razed or pillaged. Many of them were demolished by explosives, and others subjected to ritual desecration, through the conversion to stables. In the ancient historic Jewish graveyard on the Mount of Olives, tens of thousands of tombstones, some dating from as early as 1 BCE, were torn up, broken or used as flagstones, steps and building materials in Jordanian military installations. Large areas of the cemetery were levelled and turned into parking lots and gas stations.

The Old City of Jerusalem and its walls were added to the List of World Heritage in Danger in 1982, after it was nominated for inclusion by Jordan. Noting the "severe destruction followed by a rapid urbanization," UNESCO determined that the site met "the criteria
proposed for the inscription of properties on the List of World Heritage in Danger as they apply to both 'ascertained danger' and 'potential danger'."

Work carried out by the Islamic Waqf since the late 1990s to convert two ancient underground structures into a large new mosque on the Temple Mount/Haram al-Sharif damaged archaeological artifacts in Solomon's Stables and Huldah Gates areas. The Israel Antiquities Authority (IAA) expressed concern over the damage sustained to Muslim-period structures within the compound as a result of the digging. Jon Seligman, a Jerusalem District archaeologist told Archaeology magazine that, "It was clear to the IAA that an emergency exit [at the Marwani Mosque] was necessary, but in the best situation, salvage archaeology would have been performed first." Seligman also said that the lack of archeological supervision "has meant a great loss to all of humanity. It was an archeological crime.".

Some Israeli archaeologists also charged that archaeological material dating to the First Temple Period (c. 960-586 BCE) was destroyed when the thousands of tons of ancient fill from the site were dumped into the Kidron Valley, as well as into Jerusalem's municipal garbage dump, where it mixed with the local garbage, making it impossible to conduct archaeological examination. They further contended that the Waqf was deliberately removing evidence of Jewish remains. For example, Dr. Eilat Mazar told Ynet news that the actions by the Waqf were linked to the routine denials of the existence of the Jerusalem Temples by senior officials of the Palestinian Authority. She stated that, "They want to turn the whole of the Temple Mount into a mosque for Muslims only. They don't care about the artifacts or heritage on the site." However, Seligman and Gideon Avni, another Israeli archaeologist, told Archaeology magazine that while the fill did indeed contain shards from the First Temple period, they were located in originally unstratified fill and therefore lacked any serious archaeological value.

Archaeology in Jordan

Compared to Israel, archaeological knowledge about Jordan (formerly Transjordan) is limited. Two universities, the University of Jordan and Yarmouk University, offer archeology studies. Apart from the work of the official antiquities department, there are many foreign-educated professional archaeologists in Jordan, working on dozens of field projects. Findings have been published in the four-volume Studies in the History and Archaeology of Jordan (1982–1992).

Archaeology in Lebanon

Important sites in Lebanon dating to the Neanderthal period include Adloun, Chekka Jdidé, El-Masloukh, Ksar Akil, Nahr Ibrahim and Naame. Byblos is a well-known archaeological site, a Phoenician seaport, where the tomb of Ahiram is believed to be located. An ancient Phoenician inscription on the tomb dates to between the 13th and 10th centuries BCE. Byblos, as well as archaeological sites in Baalbek, Tyre, Sidon, and Tripoli, contain artifacts indicating the presence of libraries dating back to the period of Classical antiquity.

Archaeology in Syria

Coastal, central and southern Syria (including modern Lebanon) "constitute the major part of ancient Canaan, or the southern Levant," and according to Dever, the area is "potentially far richer in archaeology remains than Palestine." Yet, in the 19th century, Syria received significantly less archaeological exploration than Palestine. Beginning in the 1920s, large excavations have been conducted in such key sites as Ebla, Hama, and Ugarit. Albright envisioned Palestine and Syria within the same cultural orbit and, though best known for his pioneering work on biblical archaeology, he also foreshadowed contemporary scholars in using "Syro-Palestinian" to integrate the archaeology from Syria.

Syria is often acknowledged to be a "crossroads of civilizations", "traversed by caravans and military expeditions moving between the economic and political poles of the Ancient Near Eastern world, from Egypt to Anatolia, from the Mediterranean to Mesopotamia." While there is significant geographical and cultural overlap with its neighbouring regions, Akkermans and Schwartz note that specialists in Syria itself, rarely use the term "Syro-Palestinian archaeology" to describe their inquiries in the field. Syria can be seen as a distinct and autonomous geographical and cultural entity whose rainfall-farming plains could support larger scale populations, communities, and political units than those in Palestine and Lebanon.

Following the program of the French Mandate, the Syrian school of archaeology has an official antiquities department, museums in Aleppo and Damascus, and at least two important scholarly journals.

Archaeology in Turkey (Hatay Province)
The Amuq Valley in the Hatay Province of Turkey has aided in the understanding of western Syrian historical chronologies. Robert Braidwood documented 178 ancient sites in the Amuq Valley, eight of which were then further excavated. Artifacts recovered from these excavations helped in the formation of a historical chronology of Syrian archaeology spanning from the Neolithic to the Early Bronze Age.

Archaeology, history and modern Arab-Israeli politics

Archaeology has been widely influenced by the modern Arab-Israeli conflict. During the British Occupation, many Jewish and Christian populations have renewed their interest in the ancient Judaic archaeological sites located in the region. Several Palestinian authors argue that Zionists, or individuals who believe in a Jewish homeland, use archaeology to create a sense of national identity. One author, in a highly controversial book, when as far as to state that a joint project of the Jewish Palestine Exploration Society and the Va‘adat Shemot (Names Committee) attempted to rename sites from an Arab-Ottoman template to the template of biblical Israel. Today this attitude, is an important factor in the controversy over the West Bank. Judea and Samaria, (the name of the region prior to the occupation of the region by Jordan), are the locations of several archeological sites and ancient Hebrew artifacts. Israeli (and Jewish) scholar Nachman Ben-Yehuda, quoting Y. Shavit, lists the following aspects of archaeology that have been placed in the service of a Jewish homeland: (1) confirming the essence of the biblical narrative; (2) proving the continuity of Jewish settlement in Israel as well as its size; (3) "to emphasize the attitude of Jewish settlers to the land"; (4) emphasizing the practical side of life in the land; (5) providing the contemporary Jewish presence with a deep "structural-historical" meaning; and (6) "to provide the new Jewish presence with concrete symbols from the past which can be transformed into symbols of historical legitimization and presence."

Some Palestinian scholars have argued that they, not modern Jews, are the genuine descendants of the Israelites and Philistines ancient inhabitants of the land. Some have been, in essence, offering the world a reading erasing ancient Israel from the region's history. Renovations on the Temple Mount conducted by the Islamic Religious Authority, especially in the area adjoining and underlying the El-Aqsa Mosque, have sacrificed the integrity of underlying structures by dumping debris and other materials. This has contributed to the bulge in the southern wall of the Temple.

See also
 List of archaeological sites in Israel and Palestine
 Near Eastern archaeology
 Near Eastern bioarchaeology
 Prehistory of the Levant

References

Bibliography

.

.
.
.

.

.

.

.

 

.
.

.

.

External links
The West Bank and East Jerusalem Archaeological Database Project from the S. Daniel Abraham Center for International and Regional Studies, Tel Aviv University.
MEGA–Jordan Archaeological Sites Database - Getty Conservation Institute, World Monuments Fund and Jordanian Department of Antiquities
Dead Sea Scrolls still a puzzle after 50 years
New Discoveries in Mosaics in the Territory under Palestinian Authority
Nova special, The Bible's Buried Secrets
Biblical Pseudo-Archeologists Pillaging the West Bank

 
Archaeology of the Near East
Archaeology of Palestine (region)
Nationalism and archaeology